Wedges Creek is a stream in Clark County, Wisconsin, in the United States.

History
Wedges Creek derives its name from John D. Wage, a lumberman.

See also
List of rivers of Wisconsin

References

Rivers of Clark County, Wisconsin
Rivers of Wisconsin